Bodin is a parish and former municipality in Nordland county, Norway. The  municipality existed from 1838 until its dissolution in 1968. It was a large municipality encompassing all of the mainland area around the town of Bodø and part of the land on the southern shore of the Saltfjorden. In all there were over 700 islands, islets, and skerries in Bodin Municipality. All of what was Bodin Municipality now lies entirely inside the present-day Bodø Municipality.

The present-day parish of Bodin represents the mainland area immediately surrounding the town of Bodø and the western islands. The main church for the parish is the historic Bodin Church.

History
The municipality of Bodø landdistrikt was established as a municipality on 1 January 1838 (see formannskapsdistrikt).  It included the rural areas surrounding the town of Bodø.  In 1896, the name of the municipality was changed to Bodin.  On 1 July 1938, an area of Bodin (population: 559) was transferred to the town of Bodø.  On 1 January 1959, another area of Bodin (population: 1,303) was transferred to the town of Bodø.  On 1 January 1963, an area of Skjerstad (population: 224) was transferred to Bodin Municipality.

During the 1960s, there were many municipal mergers across Norway due to the work of the Schei Committee. On 1 January 1964, the majority of the municipality of Kjerringøy (population: 524) and the Øyjord area of Sørfold Municipality (population: 81) were merged into Bodin. Then on 1 January 1968, the municipality of Bodin (population: 13,323) was merged with the town of Bodø (population: 14,252) to create a new, much larger, Bodø Municipality.  Upon merging, Bodin had a population of 13,323 and Bodø had a population of 14,252.

Name
Until 1896, the name of the municipality was Bodø landdistrikt, meaning "the rural district of Bodø". The town of Bodø is named after the old Bodøgård farm meaning "the farm (gård) of Bodø". The meaning of the first element is, maybe,  which means "skerry". In 1896, the municipality was renamed Bodin which is a more modern version of the older Old Norse form .

Government
While it existed, this municipality was responsible for primary education (through 10th grade), outpatient health services, senior citizen services, unemployment, social services, zoning, economic development, and municipal roads. During its existence, this municipality was governed by a municipal council of elected representatives, which in turn elected a mayor.

Municipal council
The municipal council  of Bodin was made up of representatives that were elected to four year terms. The party breakdown of the final municipal council was as follows:

Mayors
The mayors of Bodin:

 1838–1840: Fredrik Ludvig Møller
 1840–1842: Marcus Fredrik Steen
 1842–1844: Jacob B. L. Tohrsen
 1844–1848: Jacob Coldevin	
 1848–1852: Eiler Hagerup Krog Prytz Sr.
 1852–1856: Jacob Coldevin
 1856–1858: Peter Holm
 1858–1866: E. Boye
 1867–1868: Johan Andreassen
 1869–1874: Christen Evjenth
 1875–1880: Peter Johannes Engen
 1881–1883: Wilhelm August Kiønig		
 1884–1889: M. Lundeberg		
 1890–1892: Ole Anderssen
 1892–1894: Karl Løkke
 1895–1898: Olaus Holter
 1899–1901: Gustav Theodor Baumann (V)
 1902–1904: L.K. Christie
 1904–1909: Haakon Evjenth
 1909–1928: Ole Løkke 
 1929–1931: Arnt Gurnerius Holm (FV)
 1932–1940: Severin Edvardsson	
 1941-1941: S.U. Johansen (NS)
 1941–1944: Halvdan Zahl (NS)
 1944–1945: Fredrik Korsvik Rasmussen (NS)
 1945-1945: Severin Edvardsson	
 1946–1951: Gregorius Honstad
 1952–1955: Hans Berg (KrF)
 1956–1959: Edgar Gundersen
 1960–1963: Odd Henning Grønmo
 1964–1968: Henry Forsaa (Ap)

Notable people
Adelsteen Normann (1848-1918), a painter
Reidar Carlsen (1908- 1987), a politician for the Labour Party of Norway

See also
List of former municipalities of Norway

References

Bodø
Former municipalities of Norway
1838 establishments in Norway
1968 disestablishments in Norway